The Economic Cooperation Organization or ECO is an Asian political and economic intergovernmental organization that was founded in 1985 in Tehran by the leaders of Iran, Pakistan, and Turkey. It provides a platform to discuss ways to improve development and promote trade and investment opportunities. The ECO is an ad hoc organisation under the United Nations Charter. The objective is to establish a single market for goods and services, much like the European Union. After the dissolution of the Soviet Union, the ECO expanded to include Afghanistan, Azerbaijan, Kazakhstan, Kyrgyzstan, Tajikistan, Turkmenistan, and Uzbekistan in 1992.

The current framework of the ECO expresses itself mostly in the form of bilateral agreements and arbitration mechanisms between individual and fully sovereign member states. That makes the ECO similar to ASEAN in that it is an organisation that has its own offices and bureaucracy for implementation of trade amongst sovereign member states. This consists of the historically integrated agricultural region of the Ferghana Valley which allows for trade and common agricultural production in the border region between Kyrgyzstan, Tajikistan and Uzbekistan. Pakistan has free trade agreements with both Afghanistan and Iran which are in the process of implementation.

In 2017, a free trade agreement between Turkey and Iran was proposed to be signed in the future, in addition to a proposed Pakistan-Turkey Free Trade Agreement. The Afghanistan-Pakistan Transit Trade Agreement is designed to facilitate trade for goods and services for Central Asia via both Afghanistan and Pakistan. That is in addition to the Ashgabat agreement, which is a multi-modal transport agreement between the Central Asian states. Further cooperation amongst members is planned in the form of the Iran–Pakistan gas pipeline, as well as a Turkmenistan–Afghanistan–Pakistan pipeline. Current pipelines include the Tabriz–Ankara pipeline in addition to the planned Persian Pipeline. This is in addition to the transportation of oil and gas from Central Asian states such as Kazakhstan and Turkmenistan to supply the industrialisation underway in Iran, Pakistan, Turkey, and beyond. Pakistan plans to diversify its source of oil and gas supplies towards the Central Asian states including petroleum import contracts with Azerbaijan.

The ECO's secretariat and cultural department are in Iran, its economic bureau is in Turkey, and its scientific bureau is in Pakistan.

History 
The Economic Cooperation Organization was the successor organisation of what was the Regional Cooperation for Development (RCD), founded in 1964, which ended activities in 1979. In 1985 Iran, Pakistan and Turkey joined to form the ECO. By the fall of 1992, the ECO expanded to include seven new members; Afghanistan, Azerbaijan, Kazakhstan, Kyrgyzstan, Tajikistan, Turkmenistan and Uzbekistan. The date of the expansion to its present strength, 28 November, is referred to as "ECO Day". The status and power of the ECO is growing. However, the organisation faces many challenges. Most importantly, the member states are lacking appropriate infrastructure and institutions which the Organization is primarily seeking to develop, to make full use of the available resources in the region and provide sustainable development for the member nations. The Economic Cooperation Organisation Trade Agreement (ECOTA) was signed on 17 July 2003 in Islamabad. ECO Trade Promotion Organization (TPO) is a new organization for trade promotion among member states located in Iran (2009). Under the agreement reached between ECO members, the common trade market should be established by 2015.

Official names
The official working language of the Economic Cooperation Organization is English. The official names of the organization are:
 Azeri: İqtisadi Əməkdaşlıq Təşkilatı
 Kazakh: Економікалйқ Йнтймақтастйқ Ūіймй
 Kyrgyz: Экономикалык Кызматташтык Уюму
 Pashto: د اقتصادي همکاريو سازمان
 Persian: سازمان همکاری اقتصادی (Sāzmān-e Hamkāri-ye Eqtesādi)
 Russian: Организация экономического сотрудничества
 Tajik: Созмони Ҳамкории Иқтисодӣ
 Turkish: Ekonomik İşbirliği Teşkilatı
 Turkmen: Ykdysady Hyzmatdaşlyk Guramasy
 Urdu: اقتصادی تعاون تنظیم
 Uzbek: Иқтисодий Ҳамкорлик Ташкилоти

Objectives and principles 
Sustainable economic development of Member States;
Progressive removal of trade barriers and promotion of intraregional trade; the Greater role of ECO region in the growth of world trade; Gradual integration of the economies of the Member States with the world economy;
Development of transport & communications infrastructure linking the Member States with each other and with the outside world;
Economic liberalization and privatization;
Mobilization and utilization of ECO region's material resources;
Effective utilization of the agricultural and industrial potentials of ECO region.
Regional cooperation for drug abuse control, ecological and environmental protection and strengthening of historical and cultural ties among the peoples of the ECO region; and
Mutually beneficial cooperation with regional and international organizations.
Sovereign equality of the Member States and mutual advantage;
Linking of national economic, development plans with ECO's immediate and long-term objectives to the extent possible;
Joint efforts to gain freer access to markets outside the ECO region for the raw materials and finished products of the Member States;
Effective utilization of ECO institutions, agreements and cooperative arrangements with other regional and international organizations including multilateral financial institutions;
Common endeavors to develop a harmonized approach for participation in regional and global arrangements;
Realization of economic cooperation strategy; and Exchanges in educational, scientific, technical and cultural fields

Membership

Full members

Observers

Structure

Council of Ministers
The Council of Ministers (COM) is the highest policy and decision-making body and is composed of the various Ministers of Foreign Affairs or such other representatives of the ministerial rank as may be designated by the respective governments. The COM meets at least once a year by rotation among the member states.

Council of Permanent Representatives
The Council of Permanent Representatives (CPR) consists of the Permanent Representatives/Ambassadors of the member states accredited to the Islamic Republic of Iran as well as to the ECO and the Director-General for ECO Affairs of the Ministry of Foreign Affairs of the Islamic Republic of Iran.

Regional Planning Council
The Regional Planning Council (RPC) is composed of the Heads of the Planning Organizations of member states or other representatives of corresponding authorities.

General Secretariat
The General Secretariat (GS) consists of six directorates under the supervision of the Secretary-General and his deputies. Two specialized agencies and six regional institutes are acting under the supervision of the GS.
 ECO Directorate of Industry & Agriculture
 ECO Directorate of Trade & Investment
 ECO Directorate of Energy, Mineral & Environment
 ECO Directorate of Transport & Communications
 ECO Directorate of Economic Research & Statistics
 ECO Directorate of Project Research & Development

Activities 
Activities of ECO are conducted through directorates under the supervision of Secretary-General and his Deputies which consider and evolve projects and programs of mutual benefit in the fields of:
 Trade and Investment
 Transport and Telecommunications
 Energy, Minerals and Environment
 Agriculture, Industry and Tourism
 Human Resources & Sustainable Development
 Project & Economic Research and Statistics

A Transport Council to develop clearer transport and transit policies is proposed.

ECO has selected Shakhrisabz as its tourism capital for 2024.

Summits and General Secretaries

Heads of State summits

List of General Secretaries

Regional Institutions & Agencies

ECO Chamber of Commerce and Industry
ECO-CCI was established on 10 June 1993. Its objectives are to contribute to enhancing economic cooperation and relations in trade, industry, agriculture, tourism, contracting, engineering and banking sectors as well as to realize joint investments among the Member States. National Chambers of Afghanistan, Azerbaijan, Iran, Kazakhstan, Kyrgyzstan, Pakistan, Tajikistan, and Turkey are members of ECO-CCI.
The 7th General Assembly Meeting of ECO Chamber of Commerce and Industry (ECO-CCI), held on 20 April 2004 in Kabul, Afghanistan. The participating member states offered some proposals for developing new mechanism and modalities for better interaction between member chambers and to re-activate ECO-CCI.

ECO Reinsurance Company
In March 1995, Iran, Pakistan, and Turkey agreed to establish ECO Reinsurance Company. The purpose is to supplement the existing reinsurance services in the region, promote the growth of the national underwriting and retention capacities, minimize the outflow of foreign exchange from the region and to support economic development in the region. The three-member countries decided to form a Trilateral Interim Committee to pave the way for the establishment of this important institution. The Trilateral Interim Committee in its various meetings reviewed the relevant issues such as the development of the business plan and signing of the Articles of Agreement already finalized by a group of Experts from the three founding member countries.

ECO Consultancy & Engineering Company
Governments of all the ECO Member States has established a central resource pool in the shape of ECO Consultancy and Engineering Company (Pvt.) Ltd., or ECO-CEC, to assist in the development projects sponsored by the ECO Member States or by its Trade and Development Bank. The founder States are the Islamic Republic of Iran, Islamic Republic of Pakistan, and Republic of Turkey which holds an equal share in ECO-CEC, Turkey being represented by two companies and Iran and Pakistan, by one each.
The Iranian and Turkish Companies specialize mainly in oil and gas pipelines, refineries, petrochemical and industrial engineering, while the Pakistani partner in all other fields of development engineering, including communications, power, urban development public health, telecommunications, water resources development and agriculture. ECO-CEC provides its expertise in the entire range of consultancy operations, starting from conception, project planning and appraisal, through pre-feasibility, feasibility and financial studies, investigation and exploration, site selection to engineering design, material and equipment specifications, construction supervision, contract management, quality control and preparation of technical manuals for the operation and maintenance of the projects.

ECO Trade and Development Bank
The Economic Cooperation Organization Trade and Development Bank (ETDB) was established by the three founding members of the Economic Cooperation Organization (ECO) in 2005 which are the Islamic Republic of Iran, Islamic Republic of Pakistan and Republic of Turkey. The Republic of Azerbaijan, the Islamic Republic of Afghanistan and the Kyrgyz Republic became the member of the ETDB in 2013, 2014 and 2015 respectively.

As of 31 December 2015, paid in the share capital of the ETDB was SDR 310,870 thousand since Azerbaijan, Afghanistan, and Kyrgyzstan are in process of payment of their paid-in capital contributions.

The Bank has successfully started its operations in 2008. Its headquarters is in Istanbul (Turkey) and representative offices are in Karachi (Pakistan) and Tehran (Iran). The primary objective of the Bank is to provide financial resources for projects and programmes in member countries. The Bank offers a range of medium-to-long term products i.e. project finance, corporate finance, trade finance and loans to support small and medium-sized enterprises directly or through financial intermediaries to private and state-owned entities. 11

ECO Cultural Institute (ECI) 

ECO Cultural Institute (ECI) is affiliated with ECO and aims at fostering understanding and the preservation of the rich cultural heritage of its members through common projects in the field of the media, literature, art, philosophy, sport and education.

Others 
ECO Supreme Audit Institutions
ECO Cultural Institute
ECO Science Foundation
ECO Educational Institute
ECO Drug Control Coordination Unit
ECO Trade Promotion Unit
ECO Post
ECO Shipping Company
ECO Regional Center for Risk Management of Natural Disasters

Relationship with other organizations 
All the ECO states are also member-states of the Organisation of the Islamic Cooperation (OIC), while ECO itself has observer status in the OIC since 1995.

Leaders of ECO member states, as of 2022
Leaders are either heads of state or heads of government, depending on which is constitutionally the chief executive of the nation's government.

See also
Gül Train
Shanghai Cooperation Organisation
South Asian Association for Regional Cooperation
Middle East economic integration
White card system
List of country groupings
List of multilateral free-trade agreements

Notes

References

External links
 ECO's Website
 ECO's Cultural Institute
 ECO's Trade and Development Bank
 ECO's Trade promotion Unit
 ECO's Post

 

 
Trade blocs
International economic organizations
International organizations based in Asia
Post-Soviet alliances
Economy of Afghanistan
Economy of Azerbaijan
Economy of Iran
Economy of Kazakhstan
Economy of Kyrgyzstan
Economy of Pakistan
Economy of Tajikistan
Economy of Turkey
Economy of Turkmenistan
Economy of Uzbekistan
United Nations General Assembly observers
Afghanistan–Pakistan relations
Afghanistan–Tajikistan relations
Pakistan–Tajikistan relations
Kyrgyzstan–Tajikistan relations
Kyrgyzstan–Uzbekistan relations
Tajikistan–Uzbekistan relations
Pakistan–Uzbekistan relations
Pakistan–Turkey relations
Pakistan–Turkmenistan relations
Iran–Pakistan relations
Kazakhstan–Kyrgyzstan relations
Kazakhstan–Uzbekistan relations
Iran–Turkey relations
Azerbaijan–Kazakhstan relations
Kazakhstan–Pakistan relations